Dipodium scandens is an orchid species that is native to Malesia.

Taxonomy
The species was formally described in 1849 by German-Dutch botanist Carl Ludwig Blume who gave it the name Leopardanthus scandens. It was given its current name by Dutch botanist Johannes Jacobus Smith in 1905.

Dipodium pandanum is recorded as a synonym of Dipodium scandens by the World Checklist of Selected Plant Families. However it is treated as a synonym of Dipodium pictum in the Australian Plant Census.

Distribution
The World Checklist of Selected Plant Families lists the distribution of this species as Borneo, Java, the Philippines, Sulawesi, New Guinea, the Bismark Archipelago, the Solomon Islands and Queensland. In Australia, the Queensland population originally classified under Dipodium pandanum is currently referred to Dipodium pictum according to the Australian Plant Census.

References

External links

scandens
Orchids of Indonesia
Orchids of Malaysia
Orchids of New Guinea
Orchids of the Philippines
Flora of the Solomon Islands (archipelago)
Plants described in 1849